Indian Run is a stream located entirely within Ritchie County, West Virginia. It is a tributary of Hughes River.

Indian Run was named after the Native Americans (Indians).

See also
List of rivers of West Virginia

References

Rivers of Ritchie County, West Virginia
Rivers of West Virginia